Andrés Marzal de Sas, or Andreu Marçal de Sax (fl. 1390-1410) was a painter of Dutch origin who worked in Valencia. Based on his name, he was from Sas van Gent, although some sources indicate he may have been from Saxony. His only documented work is a "Doubting Thomas", now in the museum of Valencia Cathedral.

Life and work 
Together with Pere Nicolau, he is considered to be a major representative of the International Gothic style and helped introduce Early Netherlandish painting to Spain. His influence on Gener is apparent in the Gothic altarpiece of Santes Creus, which Gener painted with Lluís Borrassà. 

Some art historians have tentatively credited him with the "Altarpiece of Saint George" also known as the "Centenar de la Ploma", after a guard of crossbowmen, organized in 1365 by King Peter IV of Aragon, as an escort for the official banners of Valencia. The altarpiece also depicted the Battle of the Puig. That panel, dated c.1400, is now preserved at the  Victoria and Albert Museum.

A document from 1410 indicates that he was awarded a pension by the City Council, as he had become ill and fallen into poverty.

References

Further reading
 Gran Enciclopèdia Catalana : Andreu Marçal de Sax
 Biografías y Vidas : Andrés Marzal de Sax o de Sas
 Larousse : Andrés Marzal de Sax

External links 

 Patrimoine culturel de l'Aragon : Anunciación, de Andrés Marzal de Sas
 BnF : Vierge à l'enfant avec des anges musiciens / Andrés Marzal de Sas

14th-century artists
15th-century artists
Religious artists
Dutch painters
Dutch emigrants to Spain